My (formerly known as My FM) is a Malaysian-Chinese language private radio station managed by Astro Radio, a subsidiary of Astro Holdings Sdn Bhd. In 2015, as according to Nielsen RAM Survey Wave #1, My FM maintained its position as Malaysia's leading Chinese-language station with over 2.0 million listeners, although in northern regions of West Malaysia, it was challenged by 988 which is currently the leading Chinese radio station there. In the same year, the radio launched an evening Super Drive Time shift every weekday from 4pm - 8pm for East Malaysian listeners.

History 
My FM went on air on 1 August 1998, after previously broadcast as an Astro-only radio channel since the launch of the satellite network on 1 June 1996 under the name Chuan Zhen Xin Qu Tai (Chinese name: 傳真心曲台, literally "Fax heart song"). Prior to this, the frequencies of MY FM was used by TalkRadio, along with Hitz FM, Mix FM, Light & Easy and Classic Rock (still available on Astro and online, frequency taken over by Era FM, which also began broadcasting on 1 August of that year) was among the earliest privately owned English language radio stations to be broadcast in Malaysia, having launched into the airwaves on New Year's Day 1997 at midnight stroke MST. It was the second private Chinese radio station in Malaysia after REDI-FM 98.8 (now 988), which had begun broadcasting two years earlier as a trilingual station, but Chinese content represents 50 percent of its programming before it was relaunched as full-fledged Chinese radio station in December 1997. The country had only one Chinese-language radio station before this, which was the government-owned Radio Malaysia Channel 5.

Originally, the radio station mainly focused on Chinese songs for all ages. However, with the launch of Melody FM in August 2012, which replaced XFM on Astro and FM frequencies (continued as an online station but now defunct), some older songs and announcers were moved from MY FM to that new radio station.

Tagline
音乐无限，贴心空间    Great Music, Great Company（1998 - 2008）
至尊10载 有你更精彩（2008 - 2009）
MY FM, MY MUSIC（2009 - 2018）
More Music, More FUN (2015 - 2018）
MY 好玩    MY, It's so Much FUN (up from 2018）

Frequency

Television satellite
Astro (television): Channel 853

Notes: My Sabah and My Sarawak are not available on via satellite TV Astro.

Gallery

References

External links 
 
 

1998 establishments in Malaysia
Radio stations established in 1998
Radio stations in Malaysia
Chinese-language radio stations in Malaysia